Walter Henry Roettger (August 28, 1902 – September 14, 1951) was an American professional baseball player who was an outfielder in the major leagues from  to . He played for the St. Louis Cardinals, Cincinnati Reds, New York Giants and Pittsburgh Pirates, and was a member of the 1931 World Series champion Cardinals.

In 599 games played, Roettger batted .285 (556–1,949) with 192 runs scored, 19 home runs and 245 RBI in eight MLB seasons. In the 1931 World Series, he hit .286 (4–14). His career fielding percentage was .986 at all three outfield positions.

Biography
Roettger attended the University of Illinois, graduating in 1924.  While at Illinois, he played basketball and baseball. In 1931 while playing for the Cardinals, he got the first hit (off Lefty Grove) and scored the first run in the 1931 World Series.

He became the head coach for baseball at the University of Illinois from 1935 to 1951 and an assistant coach for basketball from 1936 to 1949.

Roettger died by suicide in Champaign, Illinois, at the age of 49.

Roettger had two brothers who were involved in Major League Baseball. Hal Roettger served as an assistant to baseball executive Branch Rickey for nearly 20 years until he died unexpectedly in the swimming pool of a Florida motel in 1955. Oscar Roettger was a major league pitcher and first baseman who later coached minor league baseball.

References

External links
, or Retrosheet
 

 Wally Roettger at SABR (Baseball BioProject)

1902 births
1951 suicides
American men's basketball players
American people of German descent
Baseball players from Missouri
Basketball coaches from Missouri
Basketball players from St. Louis
Cincinnati Reds players
Forwards (basketball)
Houston Buffaloes players
Illinois Fighting Illini baseball coaches
Illinois Fighting Illini men's basketball coaches
Illinois Fighting Illini men's basketball players
Illinois Wesleyan Titans men's basketball coaches
Major League Baseball outfielders
New York Giants (NL) players
Pittsburgh Pirates players
St. Louis Cardinals players
Suicides by sharp instrument in the United States
Suicides in Illinois
Syracuse Stars (minor league baseball) players